The Woman in Red is a 1984 American romantic comedy film directed by and starring Gene Wilder. Wilder also wrote the script, adapting it from the Yves Robert film Pardon Mon Affaire (Un éléphant ça trompe énormément). It co-stars Charles Grodin, Gilda Radner, Joseph Bologna, Judith Ivey, and Kelly LeBrock. The film won an Academy Award for Best Original Song for "I Just Called to Say I Love You", written and performed by Stevie Wonder.

The film follows a married man who becomes infatuated with another woman and his amusingly unsuccessful attempts to first meet and then become intimate with her.

Plot
San Francisco advertising man Theodore "Teddy" Pierce is amused by, then infatuated with Charlotte, a beautiful woman whose red dress goes billowing over her head by a gust of wind from crossing over a ventilation grate, and exposing her red satin string bikini panties. Despite his interest, Teddy is already happily married to Didi, but he cannot get this woman out of his mind. When his friend Joe, who has an affair of his own, is abandoned by his wife, who leaves with everything, Teddy gets cold feet and decides to forget it. Still, when he tells his friends Buddy, Joe, and Michael, they encourage him, and after meeting the woman again through his office window, he tries to ask her for a date, but mistakenly phones Ms. Milner, a plain ad-agency employee who is flattered by his interest.

From the beginning, his attempts at an affair are doomed, as he creates a charade to get to the date, but Didi tells him that their neighbor told them to take care of her small boy. Ms. Milner gets her revenge by bending Teddy's car antenna and scratching his car. Ms. Milner later tries to make amends, but later when Teddy sees that she is the one who got the memo for the date, he flees, and once more she gets her revenge by letting go of Teddy's car brake, causing him to crash his car. Ms. Milner later acts amicably with Teddy, because she already started seeing another work colleague, much to Teddy's confusion. Charlotte later agrees to meet for dinner with Teddy after he steadfastly asks for one, but once again, his plans fail when he receives a call from Charlotte saying she is in Los Angeles working and to go meet her. He creates another charade by writing a fake telegram from work and sending it to himself, telling him to go to Los Angeles, but due to the airport being fogged in, his flight is detoured to San Diego.

Teddy ultimately does become acquainted with the woman in red, a British model named Charlotte, going horseback riding with her (after finding out she rode horseback), and even inviting her out on what is supposed to be a date with his nanny, but turns out to be an early surprise party with his relatives and Didi. Teddy's friend Buddy, who goes along them lending his car and being a chauffeur after losing a bet with Teddy, rapidly creates an excuse so as to not arouse any suspicions. After Buddy, Joe and Michael create a ruse to take him to Charlotte, he radically alters his wardrobe and begins acting nonchalant to try to capture his love's interest.

Events come to a head in Charlotte's high-rise apartment, where she invites Teddy into her satin bed. He is thrilled, as he is finally about to consummate his fantasy, until her airline pilot husband suddenly comes home. Trying to escape, Teddy ends up on a ledge, where passersby below gather as they believe he is about to take his own life, all captured on live television. Didi, while watching this on live television, tears up as she believes Teddy is doing this because of her own cheating. After hearing Charlotte making love with her husband, he decides that the affair is not worth it and jumps off the window ledge, and waits to be caught by the firemen. While falling, Teddy sees a lovely newswoman who smiles at him, perhaps hinting at another affair chase.

Cast

Production

Background
In 1975, Wilder released his directorial debut, The Adventure of Sherlock Holmes' Smarter Brother. The film was a financial success, and was followed up in 1977 by The World's Greatest Lover, again, a financial success. Between the two movies, the French film Pardon Mon Affaire was released, as well as its sequel Pardon Mon Affaire, Too!

'The Woman in Red' was Wilder's first directed film in seven years. During that time he starred in the films The Frisco Kid, Sunday Lovers, Stir Crazy & Hanky Panky.

Filming 
The Woman in Red was shot in the fall of 1983.

Music

The original motion picture soundtrack was composed by Stevie Wonder, with the exception of "It's More Than You" by Ben Bridges, and features performances by Wonder and Dionne Warwick. Wonder received an Academy Award for Best Original Song for the song "I Just Called to Say I Love You." 
The album reached number four on the US Billboard 200 chart, number one on the R&B Albums chart (for four weeks), and number two on the UK Albums Chart. It reached number one on the Italian, Spanish, and Swedish  album charts.

Release

The Woman in Red was released by Orion Pictures in the United States on August 15, 1984.

Home media
The film was originally released on VHS and LaserDisc, and then DVD.
In the U.S. and Canada Kino Lorber released The Woman in Red on Blu-ray in 2017 with a trailer and an audio commentary track by critic and filmmaker Jim Hemphill. In January 2019 a German Blu-ray was released.

Reception
The film gained publicity for Kelly LeBrock, a real-life model making her screen debut, particularly for the skirt-and-grate scene, a variation of Marilyn Monroe's iconic pose in The Seven Year Itch.

Critical response

On Rotten Tomatoes, the film has an approval rating of 32% based on reviews from 19 critics. On Metacritic the film has a score of 55 out of 100, based on reviews from 10 critics.

Richard Schickel of Time wrote that the film was "one of this summer's more pungent pleasures, a well-made sex farce of classical proportions. If there is a horse to fall off or an airplane forced to land at the wrong airport, you may be sure Teddy will be aboard."

Variety wrote that "the laughs roll along readily as Wilder tries one idea after another to sneak out on wife Judith Ivey and family to rendezvous with Le Brock." Variety also praised Gilda Radner for her performance.

Jeff Stricker of the Minneapolis Star-Tribune said, "there is nothing deep or profound in this movie, but there are no pretensions, either. It is a light, summer-weight sitcom and a loving adaptation of its French predecessor, a pleasing 80 minutes that won't leave you hysterical, but will certainly amuse."

Kathleen Carroll of the New York Daily News had mixed feelings about the film, saying she thought it was "a giddy, reasonably funny farce, but its characters, especially Teddy's three infantile male buddies, are not nearly as well-defined as  they were in the original French comedy."

A far more negative review came from Ralph Novak of People, who said, "when it comes to criminal waste of time and talent, it would be hard to top this would-be romantic comedy, which Gene Wilder wrote, directed, and stars in"; he singled out the use of Stevie Wonder's songs ("having access to the ability of Stevie Wonder and trashing it in this way ought to be a capital offense"), and called it "spurious in the extreme" before adding that it "drones on through all the clichés of infidelity to a resolution that isn't emotionally, morally or comedically satisfying."

Gene Siskel of the Chicago Tribune awarded the film only one star, and declared, "the only reason to watch the film is an occasional glimpse of the stunningly beautiful model Kelly Le Brock making her feature-film debut as the femme fatale who turns the head of the married milquetoast character played by Wilder." He dismissed the other central characters as "some kind of sick variation on the classic swinging California married man" and had even less positive things to say about the presentation of Gilda Radner in it: 

Nancy Scoll of the San Francisco Examiner also awarded the film a one-star rating and said that it was "a classic example of a self-indulgent actor who should never direct or write [because] the script is embarrassing and the gags are clumsy."

Accolades

The film is recognized by American Film Institute in these lists:
 2004: AFI's 100 Years...100 Songs:	
 "I Just Called to Say I Love You" – Nominated

See also
 What Happened on Twenty-third Street, New York City
 White dress of Marilyn Monroe

References

External links
 
 
 
 

1984 films
1984 romantic comedy films
1980s English-language films
American remakes of French films
American romantic comedy films
Films directed by Gene Wilder
Films scored by John Morris
Films set in San Francisco
Films shot in San Francisco
Films that won the Best Original Song Academy Award
Films with screenplays by Jean-Loup Dabadie
Films with screenplays by Gene Wilder
Orion Pictures films
1980s American films